The Sri Lanka national cricket team toured Pakistan from August to October 1995 and played a three-match Test series against the Pakistan national cricket team. Sri Lanka won the Test series 2–1. Sri Lanka were captained by Arjuna Ranatunga and Pakistan by Rameez Raja. In addition, the teams played a three-match Limited Overs International (LOI) series which Sri Lanka won 2–1. Sri Lanka won both series having lost the first match in each.

Test series summary

1st Test

2nd Test

3rd Test

ODI series

1st ODI

2nd ODI

3rd ODI

References

External links

1995 in Sri Lankan cricket
1995 in Pakistani cricket
1995
International cricket competitions from 1994–95 to 1997
Pakistani cricket seasons from 1970–71 to 1999–2000